Lee Harding is a singer.

Lee or Leigh Harding may also refer to:

Lee Harding (writer)
Leigh Harding, footballer